Britt Woodman (June 4, 1920 – October 13, 2000) was an American jazz trombonist.

Career 
Woodman was a childhood friend of Charles Mingus, but first worked with Phil Moore and Les Hite. After service in World War II he played with Boyd Raeburn before joining with Lionel Hampton in 1946. During the 1950s he worked with Ellington. As a member of Ellington's band he can be heard on Such Sweet Thunder (1957), Ella Fitzgerald Sings the Duke Ellington Song Book (also 1957), Black, Brown, and Beige (1958) and Ellington Indigos (1958).

In 1960 he left Ellington to work in a pit orchestra. Later he worked with Mingus and can be heard on the album Mingus Mingus Mingus Mingus Mingus (1963). In the 1970s, he led his own octet and worked with pianist Toshiko Akiyoshi. In 1989, he was in the personnel for the album Epitaph dedicated to the previously unrecorded music of Charles Mingus.

He died in Hawthorne, California at the age of 80, having suffered severe respiratory problems.

Discography

As sideman
With Toshiko Akiyoshi – Lew Tabackin Big Band
 Long Yellow Road (RCA, 1975)
 Tales of a Courtesan (RCA Victor, 1976)
 Insights (RCA, 1976)

With Bill Berry
 Hot & Happy (Beez, 1974)
 Hello Rev (Concord Jazz, 1976)
 For Duke (M&K RealTime 1978)

With Duke Ellington
 Ellington Uptown (Columbia, 1951)
 Seattle Concert (RCA Victor, 1954)
 Ellington '55 (Capitol, 1954)
 Dance to the Duke! (Capitol, 1954)
 Ellington Showcase (Capitol, 1955)
 Historically Speaking (Bethlehem, 1956)
 Duke Ellington Presents... (Bethlehem, 1956)
 Such Sweet Thunder (Columbia, 1957)
 A Drum Is a Woman (Columbia, 1957)
 Ellington at Newport (Columbia, 1957)
 Indigos (Columbia, 1958)
 Newport 1958 (Columbia, 1958)
 The Cosmic Scene (Columbia, 1958)
 Black, Brown, and Beige (Columbia, 1958)
 Ellington Moods (Sesac, 1959)
 Ellington Jazz Party (Columbia, 1959)
 The Nutcracker Suite (Columbia, 1960)
 Solitude (Philips, 1960)
 Piano in the Background (Philips, 1960)
 Selections from Peer Gynt Suites (Columbia, 1960)
 Concert at Carnegie Hall (DJM, 1976)
 The Elegant Mister Ellington (Swing House, 1978)
 Jungle Triangle (Black Lion, 1983)
 All Star Road Band (Doctor Jazz, 1983)
 Hot Summer Dance (Red Baron, 1991)

With Ella Fitzgerald
 Ella Fitzgerald Sings the Duke Ellington Songbook (Verve, 1958)
 Rhythm Is My Business (Verve, 1962)
 Ella Fitzgerald Sings the Duke Ellington Songbook Vol. One (Verve, 1975)
 Things Ain't What They Used to Be (And You Better Believe It) (Reprise, 1971)

With Lionel Hampton
 In Concert (Durium, 1975)
 Hamp's Big Band Live! (Glad-Hamp 1979)
 Leapin' with Lionel (Affinity, 1983)
 Newport Uproar! (RCA Victor, 1968)

With Johnny Hodges
 Ellingtonia '56 (Norgran, 1956)
 The Big Sound (Verve, 1957)
 Everybody Knows (Impulse!, 1964)

With Charles Mingus
 Mingus (Candid, 1961)
 Mingus Mingus Mingus Mingus Mingus (Impulse!, 1964) 
 Epitaph (Columbia, 1990)
 The Complete Town Hall Concert (United Artists, 1962)

With Jimmy Smith
 Bashin': The Unpredictable Jimmy Smith (Verve, 1962)
 Plays Walk On the Wild Side and the Preacher (Verve, 1963)
 Peter and the Wolf (Verve, 1966)
 Hoochie Coochie Man  (Verve, 1966)

With others
 Gene Ammons, Free Again (Prestige, 1972)
 Ray Brown, With the All-Star Big Band (Verve, 1962)
 Ruth Brown, Ruth Brown '65 (Mainstream, 1965)
 Ruth Brown, Softly (Mainstream, 1972)
 Frank Capp & Nat Pierce, Juggernaut (Concord Jazz, 1977)
 Frank Capp & Nat Pierce, Live at the Century Plaza (Concord Jazz, 1978)
 Benny Carter, Live and Well in Japan! (Pablo, 1978)
 Benny Carter, Central City Sketches (MusicMasters, 1987)
 Rosemary Clooney & Duke Ellington, Blue Rose (Columbia, 1956)
 John Coltrane, Africa Brass (Impulse!, 1961)
 Randy Crawford, Everything Must Change (Warner Bros. 1976)
 Tadd Dameron, The Magic Touch (Riverside, 1962)
 Miles Davis, Blue Moods (Debut, 1955)
 Booker Ervin, Booker 'n' Brass (Pacific Jazz, 1967)
 John Fahey, Old Fashioned Love (Takoma, 1975)
 Dizzy Gillespie, Gillespiana (Verve, 1960)
 Dizzy Gillespie, Carnegie Hall Concert (Verve, 1961)
 Benny Golson, Killer Joe (Columbia, 1977)
 Chico Hamilton, The Gamut (Solid State, 1968)
 Jimmy Hamilton, It's About Time (Prestige Swingville, 1961)
 Hank Jones & Oliver Nelson, Happenings (Impulse!, 1966)
 Philly Joe Jones, To Tadd with Love (Uptown, 1982)
 Jon Lucien, Premonition (Columbia, 1976)
 Galt MacDermot, Hair Pieces (Verve, Forecast 1968)
 Teo Macero, Impressions of Charles Mingus (Palo Alto, 1983)
 Junior Mance, The Soul of Hollywood (Jazzland, 1962)
 The Manhattan Transfer, Pastiche (Atlantic, 1978)
 Wade Marcus, Metamorphosis ABC (Impulse!, 1976)
 Blue Mitchell, Smooth as the Wind (Riverside, 1961)
 Grover Mitchell, Meet Grover Mitchell (Jazz Chronicles 1979)
 James Moody, The Blues and Other Colors (Milestone, 1969)
 Maria Muldaur, Sweet Harmony (Reprise, 1976)
 Oliver Nelson, Afro/American Sketches (Prestige, 1962)
 Oliver Nelson, Impressions of Phaedra (United Artists, 1962)
 Oscar Peterson, Bursting Out with the All-Star Big Band (Verve, 1962)
 Zoot Sims, Passion Flower (Pablo, 1980)
 Billy Taylor, Taylor Made Jazz (Argo, 1959)
 Billy Taylor, Right Here, Right Now! (Capitol, 1963)
 Clark Terry, Duke with a Difference (Riverside, 1957)
 Clark Terry, Cruising (Milestone, 1975)
 Clark Terry, Squeeze Me! (Chiaroscuro, 1989)
 Teri Thornton, Devil May Care(Riverside, 1961)
 Jimmy Woode, The Colorful Strings of Jimmy Woode (Argo, 1957)

References

External links
Interview of Britt Woodman, part of Central Avenue Sounds Oral History Project, Center for Oral History Research, UCLA Library Special Collections, University of California, Los Angeles.
[ All Music]

1920 births
2000 deaths
American jazz trombonists
Male trombonists
Duke Ellington Orchestra members
Musicians from Hawthorne, California
Musicians from Los Angeles
Swing trombonists
20th-century American musicians
20th-century trombonists
American male jazz musicians
Dameronia members
The Capp-Pierce Juggernaut members
American Jazz Orchestra members
20th-century American male musicians
Jazz musicians from California